The Bahamas competed in the Summer Olympic Games for the first time at the 1952 Summer Olympics in Helsinki, Finland. Only seven men went to Helsinki to compete in the sailing, all seven were affiliated with Nassau Yacht Club.

Durward Knowles and Sloane Farrington had both competed at the 1948 Olympics for Great Britain, due to the Bahamas not being recognised by the IOC.

Sailing

References

Official Olympic Reports
sports-reference

Nations at the 1952 Summer Olympics
Bahamas at the Summer Olympics by year
1952
Olympics